John Baskin is an American television writer and producer known for series such as Three's Company, Good Times, The Jeffersons, and Crazy Like a Fox. He was twice nominated for the Humanitas Prize.

External links

American television producers
American television writers
American male television writers
Living people
Year of birth missing (living people)
Place of birth missing (living people)